Bryan Larkin (born 7 August 1973) is a Scottish actor, writer, producer and self-taught filmmaker. He was awarded the Trailblazer award at the Edinburgh International Film Festival in 2009. He is best known for his role of SAS Captain in London Has Fallen directed by Babak Najafi. and the leading role of Dolokhov in Outpost: Rise of the Spetsnaz

Early life 
Larkin was born in Glasgow and grew up in East Kilbride in Scotland to parents Frank Larkin and Andrine Larkin. He has one sister, Gillian. He trained at Langside college in Glasgow. He is a self-taught filmmaker and writer. His first short film, Reflections of a Life as writer and director premiered at the Sundance Film Festival in 2004.

Career 

Larkins career has been marked by playing on the duality of vulnerable but tough types. His performances often demonstrate a depth and complexity to otherwise two-dimensional characters. This work can be further validated in his choice of roles in action films Battleground written and directed by Neil MacKay and Outpost: Rise of the Spetsnaz Scotland born screenwriter by Rae Brunton.

After guest roles in Scottish TV shows Taggart, Rebus and River City, he wrote and starred in the short film, entitled SCENE for which he won a BAFTA Scotland Award for his performance. He later played the lead role of Joe Cullen in the BAFTA Scotland winning film Running in Traffic opposite Kenneth Cranham. He shares a second BAFTA Scotland Award with the film's co-producers, Marc Twynholm and Abigail Howkins. Running in Traffic also received its world premiere at the Edinburgh International Film Festival in 2009.

His television appearances include Doctors, playing the guest lead role of Axel Hayley in Episode 'The Messenger'. Also, the role of Geordie in Season 1 of Outlander. In 2015, he played the recurring character of Eddie in Series 3 of Shetland for BBC Scotland, opposite Game of Thrones star Ciarán Hinds.

He played the role of Robert Eldridge Dean in the American depression-era film, The Red Machine written and directed by Alec Boehm and Stephanie Argy and the lead role of, Mitch in the action film Battleground, written and directed by Neil MacKay In 2015, he appeared in the Scottish/Irish horror film Let Us Prey opposite Liam Cunningham and Pollyanna McIntosh.

In 2016, he appeared opposite Gerard Butler in London Has Fallen, in the role of SAS commander Will Davies. The film was directed by Babak Najafi and was released on 4 March by Millennium Films, under their recently revived Gramercy Pictures label.

In 2017 he was cast as the lead antagonist, Ernest Hunt, in the Hong Kong film Chasing the Dragon (Chinese: 追龍), previously known as King of Drug Dealers. It stars Donnie Yen and Andy Lau and is directed by Jason Kwan and Wong Jing. Larkin is believed to have largely improvised many of his scenes. His overall performance was highly praised, arguably because Westerners rarely get so much screen time in Hong Kong films. This allowed him to portray more facets of Hunt's character. One reviewer claimed that his performance was 'uneven, Larkin stated, 'No character ever is... That's dull. 'I wanted to show Hunt's sociopathic, and villainous side, both quietly and bombastically. Otherwise he would appear one dimensional'.

His work as a motion-capture and voice artist includes AAA titles Horizon Zero Dawn. Blood & Truth, Killzone: Mercenary and Quantum BreakLarkin also appeared in a co-starring role in Vixxena.  Critics considered Larkin one of the few highlights in the movie. Larkin was also set to reprise his role as the SAS commander opposite Gerard Butler in Angel Has Fallen, but reportedly due to story development the shooting script no longer featured his character.

Larkin also appeared in the History Channel's Vikings (season 6) series as Wiglaf, a Saxon Warrior who led the battle against Ivor the BonelessHe is also currently developing his own projects, namely the Dead End series in which he plays a nameless assassin known as 'The Contractor'. Larkin has created, produced, written and co directed the series. The central storyline follows Larkin's character across Asia, the United Kingdom and Los Angeles in his pursuit of the key players in a global Human Trafficking ring. The trilogy has been released at international film festivals and has collected more than 40 awards to date and received positive reviews for its acting, story and technical achievements.

in 2020 he was cast in The Point Men formerly known by its working title of The Negotiation opposite South Korean actors, Hwang Jung-min and Hyun Bin in the supporting role of Abdullah. The film will receive a nationwide theatrical release across South Korea from 18th January 2023. 

in 2021 he was cast in Paramount Pictures forthcoming Dungeons & Dragons: Honor Among Thieves in the role of 'Chancellor Norixius'. The film is scheduled for theatrical release on March 3, 2023,

In 2022 he returned to South Korea to commence shooting of Netflix series Narco-Saints'' opposite Park Hae-soo, Ha Jung-woo and Hwang Jung-min. co-written and directed by Yoon Jong-bin.

Awards and nominations

Filmography

References

External links 

Living people
Scottish male film actors
Scottish male television actors
1973 births